= İskenderun İESK =

Turkish football club

İskenderun İşitme Engelliler Spor Kulübü
- Nickname: İskenderun İESK
- Leagues: Turkish Deaf Football First League
- Location: İskenderun/Hatay, Turkey
- Team colors: Orange and Blue
- President: (Turkey) Mehmet Çörtük

İskenderun İESK is the deaf football club located in İskenderun in Hatay, southern Turkey. The team competes in Turkish Deaf Football First League.

== League participations ==
- Turkish Deaf Football First League: 2013–present

== League performances ==
| Season | League | Pos | Pld | W | D | L | PF | PA | Pts |
|---|---|---|---|---|---|---|---|---|---|
| 2012–13 | Turkish Deaf Football Second League – 2nd Group | 2 | 5 | 4 | 0 | 1 | 18 | 6 | 12 |
| 2013–14 | Turkish Deaf Football First League – 4th Group | 6 | 16 | 5 | 2 | 9 | 28 | 43 | 17 |
| 2014–15 | Turkish Deaf Football First League – 8th Group | 2 | 8 | 5 | 0 | 3 | 16 | 11 | 15 |
| 2015–16 | Turkish Deaf Football First League – 4th Group | 2 | 16 | 11 | 0 | 5 | 40 | 22 | 33 |
| 2016–17 | Turkish Deaf Football First League – 3rd Group | 8 | 14 | 1 | 1 | 12 | 21 | 60 | 4 |

| Promotion |
| Relegation |
